Pseudogiria is a genus of moths of the family Erebidae. The genus was erected by Emilio Berio in 1965.

Species
Pseudogiria angulata (Bethune-Baker, 1909)
Pseudogiria hypographa (Hampson, 1926)
Pseudogiria polita Berio, 1965
Pseudogiria variabilis (Holland, 1920)

References

Calpinae